Frizinghall is a district in the Heaton ward of the City of Bradford, West Yorkshire, lying  north of the city centre close to the town of Shipley, itself a part of the City of Bradford Metropolitan District along with such other nearby towns as Keighley and Ilkley.

Frizinghall derives its name from a type of rough woollen cloth  made in the area (frieze), and the hall was somewhere in the settlement (ing) where the frieze was made. Others believe the name comes from Old English; The Frisian's nook of land (Frisian being a personal name) or from Furze-covered Haugh (haugh being an enclosure).

Frizinghall is notable as the birthplace of famous cricketer (and later commentator) Jim Laker.

The fictitious town of Frizinghall in Wilkie Collins' book The Moonstone'' is near the Yorkshire coast.

See also
Listed buildings in Bradford (Heaton Ward)

References

External links

Areas of Bradford